Loka pri Mengšu is a village in the Municipality of Mengeš in the Upper Carniola region of Slovenia.

Church

The local church, standing isolated in a field outside the village, is dedicated to Saints Primus and Felician.

Castle
The recently renovated Jablje Castle is southwest of the settlement.

References

External links

Loka pri Mengšu on Geopedia
PGD Loka pri Mengšu

Populated places in the Municipality of Mengeš